Dave Hamelin (born October 3, 1980) is a Canadian musician, songwriter and producer known for his work with indie rock band the Stills. Originally the band's drummer, he moved to guitar and co-lead vocalist in 2005 when guitarist Greg Paquet left the band.

On March 28, 2009, the Stills were awarded two Juno Awards for their album Oceans Will Rise, in the categories of Best New Group and Best Alternative Album. In 2010, Paquet rejoined and Hamelin moved back to drums. The Stills announced their breakup on April 15, 2011.

In 2009, Hamelin formed the band Eight and a Half with Stills' keyboardist Liam O'Neil and Broken Social Scene drummer Justin Peroff. They released their self-titled debut in 2012.

Production work
From 2013 onward, Hamelin has worked frequently as a producer.

He co-produced and mixed Broken Social Scene frontman Kevin Drew's second solo record, Darlings (2014); co-produced and mixed Andy Kim's It's Decided (2015) with Drew and Ohad Benchetrit; co-produced and mixed the Tragically Hip's album Man Machine Poem (2016) with Drew; and co-produced and mixed Gord Downie's album Secret Path (2016).

In 2016, he mixed the Sam Roberts Band album TerraForm

He produced and mixed the Belle Game's 2016 single "Yuh", as well as their 2017 album Fear Nothing.

In 2017, Hamelin played on and mixed Downie's final album, Introduce Yerself.

Hamelin co-wrote, produced and mixed the Leikeli47 track "Chain Gang" for the soundtrack to the 2018 film Uncle Drew.

Hamelin produced 9 songs on 070 Shake's 2020 album [Modus Vivendi] and was an executive producer on her sophomore album You Can't Kill Me, contributing to every song on the album.

Discography

As band member
{| class="wikitable"
|-
! width="33"| Year
! width="150"| Band
! width="260"| Release
|-
| align="center" rowspan="2"| 2003
| The Stills
| Rememberese EP
|-
| The Stills
| Logic Will Break Your Heart
|-
| align="center"| 2006
| The Stills
| Without Feathers  
|-
| align="center" | 2008
| The Stills
| Oceans Will Rise
|-
| align="center"| 2012
| Eight and a Half
| Eight and a Half  
|-

Production credits

References

Canadian rock drummers
Canadian male drummers
Canadian rock guitarists
Canadian male guitarists
Canadian rock singers
Canadian male singer-songwriters
Musicians from Montreal
Living people
Canadian indie rock musicians
1980 births
People from Lachine, Quebec
Canadian record producers
21st-century Canadian guitarists
21st-century Canadian drummers
21st-century Canadian male singers